Staufenberg is a town in the district of Gießen, in Hesse, Germany. It is situated on the river Lumda, 10 km north of Gießen.

References

Towns in Hesse
Giessen (district)